André Filipe Farias Marques (born 1 August 1987) is a Portuguese former professional footballer who played as a left back.

Club career
Marques was born in Laceiras, Carregal do Sal, Viseu District. Having made his professional debut with Sporting CP in 2005–06, he spent the following season on loan to second division's C.D. Olivais e Moscavide. He was also loaned the next year, upgrading to U.D. Leiria of the Primeira Liga; a lack of playing opportunities prompted another loan in February 2008, this time to S.C. Freamunde in the second level.

In 2008–09, Marques was loaned again by Sporting, now to Vitória F.C. as he was only fourth-choice for the Lisbon club. After Aly Cissokho's departure to FC Porto in January 2009, he became the starter, scoring his first goal in the top flight on the 30th but in a 2–4 home loss against Vitória de Guimarães.

For the 2009–10 campaign, Marques was recalled by Sporting. In the preseason, as Leandro Grimi was still convalescing from a serious injury and veteran Marco Caneira was often played out of his centre back position, he impressed and managed to make the roster, starting in the UEFA Champions League qualifiers against FC Twente (one match) and ACF Fiorentina (both).

Before 2010–11 started, Marques was told he was not part of newly appointed coach Paulo Sérgio's plans, which led to another loan deal, this time with S.C. Beira-Mar, recently promoted to the top tier. He stayed in Aveiro for the following season, but was sidelined for several months due to a knee injury.

From 2012 to 2014, Marques competed in the Swiss Super League. Twenty of his 21 appearances came in the former campaign, and he subsequently returned to his country's top division with Moreirense FC, again being bothered with persistent physical problems.

On 16 June 2017, after one year of inactivity, the 30-year-old Marques joined CSM Politehnica Iași from the Romanian Liga I. He was released less than one month later, however.

Club statistics

References

External links

1987 births
Living people
Portuguese footballers
Association football defenders
Primeira Liga players
Liga Portugal 2 players
Sporting CP footballers
C.D. Olivais e Moscavide players
U.D. Leiria players
S.C. Freamunde players
Vitória F.C. players
S.C. Beira-Mar players
Moreirense F.C. players
Super League Greece players
Iraklis Thessaloniki F.C. players
Swiss Super League players
FC Sion players
FC Politehnica Iași (2010) players
Portugal youth international footballers
Portugal under-21 international footballers
Portuguese expatriate footballers
Expatriate footballers in Greece
Expatriate footballers in Switzerland
Portuguese expatriate sportspeople in Greece
Portuguese expatriate sportspeople in Switzerland
Sportspeople from Viseu District